Inspiral Carpets The Singles Is a compilation of singles by English band Inspiral Carpets, released 18 September 1995 on Mute Records.

Track listing

LP/CD: Mute Records / (CD) MOOTEL 3 (UK) 
Tracks are listed on artwork in non-chronological order.  However they play on the actual disc in order of original release.  Several tracks appear as different versions to those on their parent albums.
 "Joe" (3:23)
 "Find Out Why" (2:04)
 "Move" (3:26)
 "This Is How it Feels [single version]" (3:13)
 "She Comes in the Fall [single version]" (4:10)
 "Commercial Reign" (4:43)
 "Sackville [single version]" (4:59)
 "Biggest Mountain" (4:29)
 "Weakness" (4:18)
 "Caravan [12" version]" (5:47)
 "Please be Cruel [single version]" (3:38)
 "Dragging Me Down" (4:33)
 "Two Worlds Collide" (4:41)
 "Generations" (2:49)
 "Bitches Brew" (3:52)
 "How it Should Be" (3:17)
 "Saturn 5" (3:59)
 "I Want You [single version ft. Mark E. Smith]" (3:10)
 "Uniform" (3:52)

2xLP: Mute Records / LMOOTEL 3 (UK)
 Limited edition double vinyl release with bonus 7":

 "Weakness (Live)"
 "Caravan (Live)"

Singles
 Dung 27 - "Joe (Acoustic)" (1995)

VHS: Mute Film 

"Joe '95" (3:21)
 "This Is How it Feels" (3:13)
 "She Comes in the Fall (4:12)
 "Commercial Rain" (4:41)
 "Biggest Mountain" (4:27)
 "Caravan" (3:40)
 "Please be Cruel" (3:38)
 "Dragging Me Down" (4:24)
 "Two Worlds Collide" (4:36)
 "Generations" (2:48)
 "Bitches Brew" (3:49)
 "How it Should Be" (3:13)
 "Saturn 5" (3:51)
 "I Want You" (3:20)
 "Uniform" (3:53)

References

1995 greatest hits albums
Inspiral Carpets albums
Mute Records compilation albums